María José is a Spanish language female given name. Maria José is a Portuguese language female given name. It is a combination of the names María and José, often given in reference to the mother and foster father of Jesus.

Notable persons with either of these names include:
Maria José (actress) (1928–2020), Portuguese actress
María José (singer) (born 1976), Mexican singer and dancer
María José (album), her debut album
Maria José of Portugal (1857–1943), Portuguese infanta
María José Bongiorno, Argentine politician
Marie José Burki (born 1961), Swiss video artist and educator
María José Castillo (born 1990), Costa Rican singer
María José (EP)
María José Catalá (born 1981), Spanish politician
Maria José Dupré (1905–1984), Brazilian writer
María José Guerra Palmero (born 1962), Spanish philosopher
María José Maldonado (born 1985), Paraguayan beauty queen and singer
Maria José Marques da Silva (1914–1996), Portuguese architect
María José Martínez Sánchez (born 1982), Spanish tennis player
María José Montiel (born 1968), Spanish opera mezzo-soprano
María José Pérez (volleyball) (born 1988), Venezuelan volleyball player
María José Pons (born 1984), Spanish football goalkeeper 
María José Poves (born 1978), Spanish race walker
María José Rienda (born 1975), Spanish alpine skier
María José Sarmiento, Argentine judge
Maria José Uribe (born 1990), Colombian golfer
María José Urzúa (born 1983), Chilean actress

See also

José María, a male given name

Spanish feminine given names
Portuguese feminine given names